Emma Franklin Estabrook (1865 – January 24, 1962) was a scholar and author who wrote on Native American subjects including the Pueblo. Her book Givers of Life was published by the University of New Mexico Press. The Autry Museum of the American West has a collection of her papers.

She was involved in discussions of how Native American dance rituals were described.

Her 1932 book was unfavorably welcomed in one review. Another review was more favorable.

Bibliography
Givers of Life: The American Indians as Contributors to Civilization (1932) University of New Mexico Press, illustrated
The American Desert (1946)
The American Desert, and songs of light (1952) poetry
My Life in Two Centuries (1955)
Ancient Lovers of Peace (1959)

References

1865 births
1962 deaths
20th-century American women writers